The following are the winners of the 17th annual ENnie Awards, held in 2017:

Judges' Spotlight Winners 

Rippers Resurrected (Pinnacle Entertainment Group)– Stacy Muth
The Ninja Crusade 2e (Third Eye Games)– Jakub Nowosad
Tales from the Yawning Portal (Wizards of the Coast)– Kayra Keri Küpçü
Coriolis – The Third Horizon (Free League Publishing)– Kurt Wiegel
Broodmother Skyfortress (Lamentations of the Flame Princess)- Reece Carter

Gold and Silver Winners

References

External links
 2017 ENnie Awards

 
ENnies winners